My Princess is a 2011 South Korean romantic comedy television series, starring Song Seung-heon, Kim Tae-hee, Park Ye-jin, and Ryu Soo-young. It aired on MBC from January 5 to February 24, 2011 on Wednesdays and Thursdays at 21:55 for 16 episodes.

Synopsis
An ordinary and gorgeous college student, Lee Seol (Kim Tae-hee), finds out that she is a princess and the great-granddaughter of the Joseon Dynasty's last Emperor, Emperor Sunjong. The grandson of the chairman of Daehan Group, Park Hae-young (Song Seung-heon), is put in charge of educating Seol on proper etiquette in order for her to fulfill her role. However, Hae-young is put in a precarious situation when he finds himself drawn to Seol, the girl who will take away his inheritance if the monarchy is restored.

Cast

Main
Song Seung-heon as Park Hae-young 
Choi Won-hong as young Hae-young
Kim Tae-hee as Lee Seol
Jeon Min-seo as young Seol
Park Ye-jin as Oh Yoon-joo 
Ryu Soo-young as Nam Jung-woo

Supporting
Lee Soon-jae as Park Dong-jae, Hae-young's grandfather and chairman of the Daehan Group
Maeng Sang-hoon as Oh Ki-taek, Yoon-joo's father and Park Dong-jae's secretary
Kang Ye-sol as Lee Dan, Seol's adoptive sister
Im Ye-jin as Kim Da-bok, Seol's adoptive mother
Lee Gi-kwang as Geon-yi, royal chef
Son Seong-yoon as Shin Mi-so, palace maid
Hwang Young-hee as Hong In-ae, chief palace maid
Lee Sung-min as Lee Young-chan, President of the Republic of Korea	
Lee Dae-yeon as So Sun-woo
Choi Yu-hwa as Kang Sun-ah, Seol's friend from school
Baek Bong-ki as Bong-jae, bodyguard
Heo Tae-hee as aide
Chu Hun-yub as Yoo Ki-kwang, reporter 
Min Joon-hyun as reporter
Park Hyuk-kwon as Lee Han, Seol's father
Park Jung-woo as Park Hae-young's father
Ahn Nae-sang as Emperor Sunjong (cameo)
Jo Sung-ha as Park Dong-jae's father (cameo)
Cha Hwa-yeon as fashion designer (cameo)
Jung Suk-yong as priest (cameo, episode 4)
Joo Sang-wook as Hyun-woo (cameo, episode 9)
Park Min-woo

Soundtrack

The My Princess original soundtrack was released as two 7-track albums by Pony Canyon Korea. Part 1 was released on January 13, 2011 and Part 2 on February 15, 2011. The soundtrack contained a number of songs used in the series, including those by Lee Sang-eun, Taru and Every Single Day.

Ratings

Awards and nominations

Media
My Princess was released in two DVD box sets in Japan. The first set containing volumes 1-4 was released on July 6, 2011 and the second with volumes 5-8 was released on August 3, 2011. Both were released under Curtain Call Production Inc., Storm S Productions and Geneon Universal Entertainment.

References

External links
My Princess official MBC website 
My Princess at MBC Global Media
 

MBC TV television dramas
2011 South Korean television series debuts
2011 South Korean television series endings
Korean-language television shows
South Korean romantic comedy television series
Television series about princesses